All That Glitters is a 1936 British comedy crime film directed by Maclean Rogers and starring Jack Hobbs, Moira Lynd and Aubrey Mallalieu. The film was made at Nettlefold Studios in Walton for distribution as a quota quickie by RKO.

Premise
A bank manager who has successfully bought into a lucrative gold mine manages to foil the plot of some confidence tricksters who plan to swindle him out of his investment.

Cast
 Jack Hobbs as Jack Tolley 
 Moira Lynd as Angela Burrows 
 Aubrey Mallalieu as Flint 
 Kay Walsh as Eve Payne-Coade 
 Annie Esmond as Mrs. Payne-Coade 
 Fred Duprez as Mortimer 
 John Robinson as Taylor 
 Dick Francis as Derek Montague

References

Bibliography
 Chibnall, Steve. Quota Quickies: The British of the British 'B' Film. British Film Institute, 2007.
 Low, Rachael. Filmmaking in 1930s Britain. George Allen & Unwin, 1985.
 Wood, Linda. British Films, 1927-1939. British Film Institute, 1986.

External links

1936 films
British black-and-white films
Films directed by Maclean Rogers
Films shot at Nettlefold Studios
Films set in England
British crime comedy films
1930s crime comedy films
1936 comedy films
1930s English-language films
1930s British films